We'll Think of Something is a British sitcom that aired on ITV in 1986. Starring Sam Kelly, it was written by Geoff Rowley, who went on to write episodes of Birds of a Feather and Goodnight Sweetheart. It was made by Thames Television and was directed by John Howard Davies.

Cast
Sam Kelly - Les Brooks
Marcia Warren - Maureen Brooks
Maggie Jones - Irene
Roger Sloman - Dennis
Ray Mort - Norman
Philip Dunbar - Eddie
Jimmy Reddington - Dave
John Barrard - Old Mr. Brooks
Tariq Yunus - Dr. Khan
Ian Bleasdale - Policeman

Plot
Les Brooks is a middle-aged man who lives in Manchester and has recently been made redundant. However, he is determined not to become unemployed and join the dole queue, so he comes up with many schemes to make money, but each one fails. His wife, Maureen, has to take a job at the local pub to make ends meet. His friends include Eddie and Dennis.

Episodes
"Not Me, Pal" (1 September 1986)
"You Know Who Your Friends Are ..." (8 September 1986)
"What's In a Gnome?" (15 September 1986)
"Business Wallah" (29 September 1986)
"Gone But Not Forgotten" (6 October 1986)
"It Comes to Us All" (13 October 1986)

References
Mark Lewisohn, "Radio Times Guide to TV Comedy", BBC Worldwide Ltd, 2003
We'll Think of Something at British TV Comedy

External links 
 

1986 British television series debuts
1986 British television series endings
1980s British sitcoms
ITV sitcoms
English-language television shows
Television shows produced by Thames Television
Television series by Fremantle (company)